Justice Doyle may refer to:

James M. Doyle (1893–1976), associate justice of the South Dakota Supreme Court
John H. Doyle (1844–1919), associate justice of the Supreme Court of Ohio
Stanley M. Doyle (1898–1975), associate justice of the Montana Supreme Court
William Edward Doyle (1911–1986), associate justice of the Colorado Supreme Court